Ovia is a genus of spiders in the family Lycosidae. It was first described in 2017 by Sankaran, Malamel & Sebastian. , it contains only one species, Ovia procurva, found in India, China, and Taiwan.

References

Lycosidae
Monotypic Araneomorphae genera
Spiders of Asia